Barbados competed in the 2010 Commonwealth Games held in Delhi, India, from 3 to 14 October 2010.

Barbados athletes.

Athletics

 Stephen Headley
 Shakera Reece

Badminton
 Mariama Eastmond
 Nicholas Reifer
 Dakeil Thorpe
 Shari Watson

Boxing
 Cobia Breedy
 Anderson Emmanuel

Cycling

Road
 Darren Matthews

Track
 Barry Forde
 Christian Lyte
 Darren Matthews

Netball
 Lydia Bishop
 Latonia Blackman
 Nadia Blackman
 Shakera Reece
 Laurel Browne
 Samantha Browne
 Makeba Clarke
 Damisha Croney
 Kizzy Marville
 Nikita Piggott
 Lisa Puckerin
 Yvette Sealy
 Sabreena Smith

Shooting
 Junior Benskin
 Bernard Chase
 Chester Foster
 Calvert Herbert
 Jennifer Jordan-Cousins
 William Murrell

Squash
 Shawn Simpson

Swimming
 Raymond Edwards

Table Tennis
 Mark-Anthony Dowell
 Kevin Farley
 Sherrice Felix
 Sabrina Worrell

Tennis
 Darian King
 Haydn Lewis

Weightlifting
 Kristin Edwards

See also
 2010 Commonwealth Games

References

Nations at the 2010 Commonwealth Games
2010
Commonwealth Games